Lieutenant-Colonel Frederick Robert Lindsay MC, DSO (11 January 1914 – 6 April 2011) was a British field hockey player who competed in the 1948 Summer Olympics.

Lindsay was born in Delhi, where his father was a civil engineer for the Indian government, and was educated at St Joseph's College in Darjeeling. He arrived in England in 1933 and enlisted in the King's Royal Rifle Corps. In 1937 he entered RMC Sandhurst, where he played hockey for the Army and Scotland.

Lindsay was commissioned into the Royal Tank Corps and served in North Africa during the Second World War, winning the Military Cross and the DSO. He then saw action during the Allied Invasion of Sicily in July 1943. In 1950 he returned to India as an instructor at the Indian Military Staff College in Wellington, south India (now the Defense Services Staff College (DSSC).

He was a member of the British field hockey team, which won the silver medal. He played all five matches as halfback. The British team lost to India, the country where Lindsay had learned the game.

References

External links
 
Frederick Lindsay's profile at databaseOlympics.com
Frederick Lindsay's profile at Sports Reference.com
Obituary of Lieutenant-Colonel Robin Lindsay, The Daily Telegraph, 10 May 2011

1914 births
2011 deaths
British male field hockey players
Olympic field hockey players of Great Britain
Field hockey players at the 1948 Summer Olympics
Olympic silver medallists for Great Britain
King's Royal Rifle Corps soldiers
Graduates of the Royal Military College, Sandhurst
Royal Tank Regiment officers
Olympic medalists in field hockey
Medalists at the 1948 Summer Olympics
British Army personnel of World War II
Military personnel of British India